Ivan Sukharev (born 10 June 1978, Vladivostok) is a Russian political figure and a deputy of the 6th, 7th, and 8th State Dumas.
 
In 1998, Sukharev joined the Liberal Democratic Party of Russia. From 1998 to 2001, he was a member of the Ufa branch of the party. From 2001 to 2003, he was the Head of the Public Reception office of Vladimir Zhirinovsky in Ufa. From 2003 to 2007, he worked as a coordinator of the Ufa branch of the party. From 2001 to 2006, Sukharev worked as a lawyer at the Bashkir Republican Bar Association. From 2011 to 2016, he was the deputy of the 6th State Duma. He became one of the initiators of the Dima Yakovlev Law. In May 2014, he supported referendums on the creation of the Donetsk and Luhansk People's Republic. In 2016 and 2021, he was re-elected for the 7th, and 8th State Dumas.

References
 

 

1978 births
Living people
Liberal Democratic Party of Russia politicians
21st-century Russian politicians
Eighth convocation members of the State Duma (Russian Federation)
Seventh convocation members of the State Duma (Russian Federation)
Sixth convocation members of the State Duma (Russian Federation)
Politicians from Ufa